Iris pseudopumila is a perennial plant with violet, purple, or yellow flowers, sometimes in combination. The beards are white, yellow, or bluish white.
Native to southern Italy.

References

pseudopumila
Flora of Europe
Endemic flora of Italy
Garden plants of Europe